The 1989 French Open was a tennis tournament that took place on the outdoor clay courts at the Stade Roland Garros in Paris, France. The tournament was held from 29 May until 11 June. It was the 93rd staging of the French Open, and the second Grand Slam tennis event of 1989.

For the first time in French Open history the Singles championships were won by two teenagers – Michael Chang (17 years, 3 months) and Arantxa Sánchez (17 years, 6 months). Chang still holds the record for youngest ever male Grand Slam singles title winner. He gained admirers for his audacious style of play and battling qualities. Sánchez broke the record for the youngest champion at Roland Garros, a record bettered the following year by Monica Seles (16 years, 6 months).

Sánchez's victory made her only the seventh woman to win a Grand Slam tournament in the 1980s; the others being Martina Navratilova, Chris Evert, Tracy Austin, Evonne Goolagong, Steffi Graf and Hana Mandlíková.

Steffi Graf's loss in the women's final was her only Grand Slam defeat in two years. She won eight of the nine Grand Slam tournaments from the 1988 Australian Open – 1990 Australian Open. This prevented her from completing a second consecutive Grand Slam and was her 9th Grand Slam final on her record run of 13 finals.

One notable débutant was Monica Seles, appearing in her first Grand Slam. She reached the semi-finals without being seeded, and aged only 15. Jennifer Capriati also made her presence felt, becoming the youngest winner (13 years, 2 months) of the girls' singles title – this record was broken in 1993 by Martina Hingis, aged 12.

Seniors

Men's singles

 Michael Chang defeated  Stefan Edberg, 6–1, 3–6, 4–6, 6–4, 6–2
It was Chang's 1st title of the year, and his 2nd overall. It was his 1st (and only) career Grand Slam title.

Women's singles

 Arantxa Sánchez Vicario defeated  Steffi Graf, 7–6(8–6), 3–6, 7–5
It was Sánchez Vicario's 2nd title of the year, and her 3rd overall. It was her 1st career Grand Slam title.

Men's doubles

 Jim Grabb /  Patrick McEnroe defeated  Mansour Bahrami /  Éric Winogradsky, 6–4, 2–6, 6–4, 7–6(7–5)

Women's doubles

 Larisa Savchenko Neiland /  Natalia Zvereva defeated  Steffi Graf /  Gabriela Sabatini, 6–4, 6–4

Mixed doubles

 Manon Bollegraf /  Tom Nijssen  defeated  Horacio de la Peña /  Arantxa Sánchez Vicario, 6–3, 6–7, 6–2

Juniors

Boys' singles
 Fabrice Santoro defeated   Jared Palmer, 6–3, 3–6, 9–7

Girls' singles
 Jennifer Capriati defeated  Eva Švíglerová, 6–4, 6–0

Boys' doubles
 Johan Anderson /  Todd Woodbridge

Girls' doubles
 Nicole Pratt /  Wang Shi-ting

Prize money

Total prize money for the event was $4,545,000.

Notes

References

External links
 French Open official website